Dominika Kaňáková (born 25 February 1991) is a Czech tennis player.

Kaňáková has won one doubles title on the ITF tour in her career. On 12 July 2010, she reached her best singles ranking of world number 723. On 24 May 2010, she peaked at world number 645 in the doubles rankings.

In April 2013, Kaňáková made her WTA tour debut at the 2013 Family Circle Cup alongside Bulgarian Jaklin Alawi in doubles.

ITF finals (1–3)

Singles (0–2)

Doubles (1–1)

References

External links 
 
 
 Dominika Kaňáková at the South Carolina Gamecocks

1991 births
Living people
People from Frýdek-Místek
Czech female tennis players
South Carolina Gamecocks women's tennis players
Sportspeople from the Moravian-Silesian Region